Suillus quiescens is a pored mushroom of the genus Suillus in the family Suillaceae. First collected in 2002 on Santa Cruz Island off the coast of California, in association with Bishop Pine (Pinus muricata), the species was scientifically described and named in 2010. In addition to its distribution in coastal California, it was also found forming ectomycorrhizae with the roots of pine seedlings in the eastern Sierra Nevada, coastal Oregon, and the southern Cascade Mountains. It resembles Suillus brevipes, but can be distinguished from that species by its paler-colored  immature cap and by the tiny colored glands on the stipe that darken with age.

Discovery
Fruit bodies of the fungus were first collected in 2002 on Santa Cruz Island, in Santa Barbara County. They were named provisionally as a new species, Suillus quiescens, in conference proceedings published in 2005. The species was officially described and named in a 2010 Mycologia publication. The specific epithet quiescens refers to the organism's ability to wait dormant (quiescent) in the soil until it encounters pine roots.

Phylogeny

Based on phylogenetic analysis of the internal transcribed spacer region in the non-functional RNA of a number of Suillus species, S. quiescens is distinct from other morphologically similar species such as S. brevipes, S. volcanalis, and S. occidentalis. The S. quiescens sequences, which were obtained from fruit bodies and from mycorrhizal root tips, formed a  clade. The analysis showed that the S. quiescens sequences were matches to some unidentified Suillus sequences found from mycorrhizae of pine seedlings collected from Oregon and California.

Description

The cap color is deep brown in mature specimens and lighter shades of brown in younger mushrooms. Young specimens have a sticky layer of gluten on the cap that dries out in maturity. The edge of the cap is rolled inwards in young specimens. The flesh of the cap is whitish and does not change color when bruised or cut. The tubes on the underside of the cap are light yellow to bright orange-yellow; the tube mouths are usually less than 1 mm wide. It is either the same width throughout or slightly larger (bulbous) at the base. The color of the upper portion of the stipe is pale to light yellow, while the lower portion may be light brown or covered with streaks of glutinous material like that on the cap. The stipe surface is covered with fine glands that are initially slightly darker than the color of the stipe surface, but deepen to brown or nearly black after drying. The color of the spore print was not determined from the initial collections, but is thought to be yellow-brown to brown based on the accumulated spore deposit seen on the surface of the caps of neighboring fruit bodies.

The elongate spores are oblong in face view, with dimensions of 6.1–14.7 by 2.4–3.7 µm. Most spores have a single large drop of oil in them. The spore-bearing cells, the basidia, are club-shaped, two- or four-spored, and measure 20.2–26.2 by 5.2–6.7 µm.

Similar species
With its short stipe and sticky cap, S. quiescens is similar to S. brevipes. It may be distinguished from the latter species by the color of the young (light-brown) cap, the glandular dots at the top of stipes in mature specimens, and the yellowish color at the top of the stipe.

Habitat and distribution

Fruit bodies grow together in small groups on the ground in association with Bishop Pine (Pinus muricata). It is the most common Suillus species on Santa Cruz Island, its type locality and it has also been collected at Santa Rosa Island, and Point Reyes National Seashore in California. Santa Cruz and Santa Rosa, two of the four islands that make up the northern Channel Islands, have a Mediterranean climate with cool and wet winters, and warm and dry summers.  Most species of Suillus do not have spores that survive in the soil for extended periods of time, but the spores of S. quiescens can tolerate the dry conditions and heat typical of California. Another study showed that viable S. quiescens spores were present in steam-pasteurized soil planted in Oregon fields. The authors suggest that S. quiescens is an early successional species that fruits in young forests, and whose spores remain dormant in the soil for extended periods of time until the roots of a suitable pine host are encountered.

References

External links

Photos at Mushroom Observer

Fungi described in 2010
Fungi of the United States
quiescens
Fungi without expected TNC conservation status